Marcus Johannes Elisabeth Leopold "Marc" Delissen (born 14 January 1965) is a former field hockey player for the Netherlands.

Delissen was born in Amsterdam, North Holland. He played 261 international matches for the Netherlands, scored 98 goals and participated in three Olympics. He made his debut when he was nineteen years old, on 21 October 1984, in a friendly match against Ireland in London. With his club HGC from Wassenaar, Delissen became Dutch champion twice, in 1990 and 1996.

He retired after the Atlanta Olympics, but returned for the 2000 Summer Olympics in Sydney, where he assisted head coach Maurits Hendriks and Holland once again became Olympic champions. Delissen later on coached his former club HGC for three years (2002–2005) in the Dutch Premier League, called Hoofdklasse. He is a practising lawyer in The Hague.

External links
 Dutch Hockey Federation

External links
 

1965 births
Living people
Dutch male field hockey players
Dutch field hockey coaches
Olympic field hockey players of the Netherlands
Field hockey players at the 1988 Summer Olympics
Field hockey players at the 1992 Summer Olympics
Field hockey players at the 1996 Summer Olympics
Field hockey players from Amsterdam
Olympic gold medalists for the Netherlands
Olympic bronze medalists for the Netherlands
Olympic medalists in field hockey
Medalists at the 1988 Summer Olympics
Medalists at the 1996 Summer Olympics
HGC players
20th-century Dutch lawyers
1990 Men's Hockey World Cup players
21st-century Dutch lawyers
20th-century Dutch people
21st-century Dutch people